Covenant College is a college on Lookout Mountain, in Georgia, near Chattanooga, Tennessee, in the USA

It may also refer to:
 Covenant Bible College Canada, a former college in Strathmore, Alberta, Canada
 Covenant Christian School (Canberra), K-10 school formerly known as Covenant College, Canberra, Australia
 Covenant College (Geelong), K-12 school in Geelong, Victoria, Australia

See also
 Covenant University, Nigeria
 Covenant School (disambiguation)
 Covenant Christian School (disambiguation)